Astictopterus punctulata is a species of butterfly in the family Hesperiidae. It is found in Cameroon, the Democratic Republic of the Congo, Uganda, Tanzania and northern Zambia. The habitat consists of Brachystegia and Uapaca woodland.

References

Butterflies described in 1895
Astictopterini
Butterflies of Africa